Othenente Makan is a 1970 Indian Malayalam-language action drama film directed and produced by Kunchacko. It is a sequel to the 1964 film Thacholo Othenan, followed by Kadathanadan Ambadi (1990). The film stars Prem Nazir, Ragini, Sathyan, Sheela and Kaviyoor Ponnamma. The film had musical score by G. Devarajan.

Plot

This is a sad tale of a brave woman, Thekkumpattu Kunji, to whom life was overwhelmingly unfair.

The movie opens introducing the feudal families of Thekkumpattu and Vadakkumpattu who have been friendly, though scheming, rivals in the region for long. A happy and peaceful future is expected at present due to the relationship between the scions of the two families - the elegant Thekkumpattu Kunji and the accomplished Vadakkumpattu Chandutty who are soon set to marry. However, a cruel twist of fate overturns their life forever. The year being the turn of Vadakkumpattu family to conduct the yearly festival at the temple, the industrious Vadakkumpattu family head has made sure that their own side of the fare eclipses that of Themkkumpattu side in every way. In a fit of jealousy, the Thekkumpattu family head (Kunji's father) disturbs an elephant in order to spoil the charm, but in the ensuing chaos, the Vadakkumpattu family head is stamped underfoot by the elephant.

Chandutty soon learns how the Thekkumpattu head is responsible for his uncle's brutal death. Enraged, he attacks the Thekkumpattu family, kills the family head and all males and lays siege the family permanently from the society as a punishment, prohibiting any relations including marriage. As a result, the uninvolved Kunji becomes an orphan overnight and essentially a prisoner in her own house under the patrol of the soldiers of her ex-fiancé, with no hopes for a normal family life any more. She is left with nobody except a couple of her trusted maids and servants. Chandutty himself is consumed in bitterness and anger, and distances himself from Kunji as well as normal family life.

Kunji sees a ray of hope as Kunkan, one of her uncles who was away travelling afar, arrives back. He tries to protect Kunji to the best of his ability and even trains her in martial arts, but is killed as soon as he is discovered by Chandutty's men, leaving Kunji alone and defenceless again.

One day, the legendary unsurpassed warrior from the North, Thacholi Manikkoth Othenan finds himself at the door of Thekkumpattu house one evening during his travels. Smitten by the elegant Kunji at first sight, he requests to be accommodated for the night. Kunji is no less smitten by the impressive Othenan as well; moreover, she starts seeing in him her last hope of liberation. Othenan is accommodated unbeknownst to the eyes of Chandutty's patrol. At this point Kunji wishes dearly that she begets an able son of noble lineage who can avenge the insult that Chandutty has inflicted on her family. She pours her heart out to Othenan, winning his emotional support, and they consummate their relationship overnight. Othenan leaves in the morning with a promise to return on the day of the coming festival, face off Chandutty, liberate Kunji and marry her.

However, as soon as Othenan reaches home, the events leading to his well-known courting of the beautiful Kavil Chathothe Kunki transpire one after another quickly (as depicted in Thacholi Othenan (1964 film)) that he is compelled to marry her on the day of the festival. Kunji realises gladly that she is pregnant with Othenan's child. Her happiness is, however, short lived as she soon learns about Othenan and Kunki's marriage ironically from none other than the unsuspecting Chandutty who was invited. Broken-hearted, she resigns to her fate and proceeds to deliver a son and raise him clandestinely inside the house, hidden from the eyes of Chandutty.

In another two decades, Ambu has grown into a brave, able young man, groomed to perfection in martial arts by none other than his mother Kunji herself, only impatient to get out of their house for the first time. At the coming of age, he is allowed to get out and visit the famous Lokanarkavu and return by the next morning. However, in the course of the journey, the young Ambu run into the beautiful Unnimathu, who happens to be Othenan's niece. A rather light spat of youthful ego between them leads to Othenan himself who comes along the way confronting Ambu. The mighty and highly respected and feared veteran that Othenan is and the young brazen Ambu who does not know his father easily fall into a war of words which leads to a challenge for duel between them. Meanwhile, Unnimathu is impressed by the young man's courage and they fall in love soon after.

Kunji is shocked to hear that her son is locked in a duel unto death with his own legendary father, tries to avoid the situation without success. Realizing that fate has other plans, she grooms her son for the duel with a brave heart.

The inevitable duel happens and contrary to expectations, the young Ambu gives the maestro Othenan a tough time. Ambu even survives Othenan's much feared signature strike "Thacholi Othiram" which none had survived before. The puzzled Othenan is locked at swordpoint by Ambu but Kunji who was present in disguise interferes before he is killed and reveals that Ambu is none other than Othenan's son.

An enraged Chandutty, realising that he was deceived, challenges them and is easily beheaded by Othenan, thus ending the story in a happy reunion.

Cast

Sathyan as Othenan Kuruppu
Prem Nazir as Ambu
Ragini as Thekkumpattu Kunji
Sheela as Unnimaathu
Vijayasree as Chathothe Kunki
K. P. Ummer as Chandutty
Adoor Bhasi as the Feudal Lord
Kaviyoor Ponnamma as Naani 
Manavalan Joseph as Chappan
Abbas
Adoor Pankajam as Uppatti
Alummoodan as Koman Nair
G. K. Pillai as Kunkan
Kanchana
Kottayam Chellappan as Thekkumpattu Karnavar
N. Govindankutty as Vadakkumpattu Karanavar
Pankajavalli as Unnichara
Premji as Thacholi Valiya Kuruppu
S. P. Pillai as Anakkan
KPAC Lalitha as Pullivathi
Radhamani

Soundtrack
The music was composed by G. Devarajan with lyrics by Vayalar Ramavarma.

References

External links
 

1970 films
1970s Malayalam-language films
Othenan2